The Battle of Hill 609 took place at Djebel Tahent in northwestern Tunisia during the Tunisian campaign of World War II. The battle was for control over the key strategic height Hill 609 and its surrounding area between the American forces of the U.S. II Corps and German units of the Afrika Korps. The battle proved a formative experience for the American forces - in their first clear-cut victory of the campaign, and has been called "the American Army's coming-of-age."

Battle
In late April 1943, Hill 609 was the key to the German defensive line facing the U.S. II Corps, commanded by Major General Omar Bradley. The German general, Hans-Jürgen von Arnim, used the hill for artillery fire and observation. From the hill, the Germans could also prevent movement by both the 1st Infantry Division, commanded by Major General Terry Allen, to the south and the 9th Infantry Division, commanded by Major General Manton S. Eddy, to the north. Hill 609 was deemed one of the most difficult objectives in Tunisia, not only protected by steep slopes and artillery but also by fire from nearby high grounds, which gave the Germans a cross fire on the slopes leading up to it. After rejecting the proposition of bypassing the mountain, Bradley ordered the 34th Infantry Division, commanded by Major General Charles W. Ryder, to take the hill. After heavy fighting and high casualties, the 34th Division managed to take the hill by April 30 and the following day repelled several German counterattacks.

See also
List of equipment of the United States Army during World War II
List of German military equipment of World War II
North African campaign
Tunisian campaign

References

Conflicts in 1943
1943 in Tunisia
Tunisian campaign
Battles of World War II involving the United States
Battles of World War II involving Germany
April 1943 events
May 1943 events